Tavis Scoot (born December 18, 1980 in Aruba), better known as Smiley, is a reggae artist. He has been making music since he was seventeen years old. He moved to the Netherlands in 2000. For three years he toured with the popular Dutch reggae band, Out of Many.

Early years
Smiley has performed at several festivals and venues in Europe and Aruba. He has also been the support act of reggae artist Ziggi Recado on his Dutch and German 'In Transit' tour.

In 2008 Smiley travelled to Jamaica to work with Barry ‘o Hare and Altafaan Records. Smiley also collaborated with Junior Kelly. The video of the track called "Dem a Wonder" has been aired by Reggae Entertainment Television, Tempo TV and TMF Pure. It also enjoyed rotation on the reggae radio station Irie FM in Jamaica.

On November 20, 2009, Smiley's song "Distance" was released on the Tek "a” Train riddim selection of the German reggae label Rootdown Records. The video reached the number 1 position in the Reggaefrance video charts. The video also aired on Tempo TV and TMF Pure.

The Lively Road EP
The Lively Road EP was released in May 2010 and had a good reception by the reggae fans. The title song of the EP became a top ten charted song in the summer of 2010 in Curaçao and Bonaire. In the same year Smiley performed at the Reggaejam and Ruhr Reggae Summerfestival in Germany.

By the end of 2010, Smiley was featured on different riddim selections and collaborations. Smiley collaborated with Spanish rapper Abram (Rogando a Jah). Smiley has songs on three of the five best German riddims of 2010, voted by the readers of Riddim Magazine. "Kokoo Riddim" (Lively Road), "Everlasting Riddim" by Powpow Movement (Bad Minds) and the "Youth Riddim" (State of Emergency).

The single "State of Emergency" was released on the same day as the single "Keep the Joy" featuring Anthony B. Both songs were featured on the Riddim Magazine mix–cd in February 2011. The song "Keep the Joy" was also featured on the comic Dread & Alive Lost Tapes mixtape vol 6 in May 2011.

Current activities
At the end of 2011, Smiley collaborated on a track with former Aftermath-artist Bishop Lamont, called "Golddiggy".

Smiley's latest song and video "What's New" was released on the Driver riddim selection by Lockdown Productions (Tippa Irie).

Discography

Music videos

Chart position

References

External links

Aruban musicians
Living people
Reggae musicians
1980 births
Dutch people of Aruban descent